Istiqlol (formerly Taboshar) is a city in Tajikistan, located in Sughd Region. Istiqlol is a city of regional subordination, administratively subordinated to the regional capital of Khujand.

The first Soviet uranium mine was established in Taboshar during the Second World War. Taboshar was the first of many officially secret Soviet closed cities related to uranium mining and production. In 2022, a contract was agreed for a subsidiary of TVEL to reclaim land on the  tailings dump, which contains  of material.

The population of Istiqlol in 2020 is estimated at 17,600.

Sports
FC Istiklol plays in Tajikistan Higher League and AFC Champions League.

See also
List of cities in Tajikistan

References

Populated places in Sughd Region
Uranium mines in Kazakhstan